Viktor Iosifovich Reneysky (given name also transliterated Victor and surname Reneyskiy, Reneiski, or Reneischi, born 24 January 1967 in Babruysk) is a sprint canoeist from Belarus who won three Olympic medals for the USSR and Moldova in the C-2 event with his teammate Nikolaï Juravschi. He also won a total of nine world titles, more than any other Canadian canoe paddler of his generation. Reneysky trained at Dynamo in Babruysk.

Reneysky and Juravschi won two gold medals at the 1988 Summer Olympics as competitors for the USSR. This success was followed by consecutive C-2 500 m world championship golds in 1989 and 1990.

C-4 events were included in the world championships for the first time and were initially dominated by the USSR. Reneysky won double C-4 gold (500 m and 1000 m) in 1989, 1990 and 1991.

Despite this run of success Reneysky and Juravschi were not selected for the 1992 Barcelona Olympics, having been defeated in the trials by Maseikov and Dovgalenok who justified their inclusion by going on to win the C-2 500 m gold medal.

The break-up of the Soviet Union meant that Reneysky and Juravschi went their separate ways. Reneysky is from Belarus whereas Juravschi represented Romania and then his newly independent homeland of Moldova.

However, in 1995 Juravschi persuaded his former partner to join forces once more and represent Moldova at the 1996 Atlanta Olympics. They won silver.

The following year Reneysky was competing for his native Belarus and won the final world championship gold (C-4 200 m) of his career.

Reneysky then went into coaching as is now head of the Belarus national team. In 2005 in Plovdiv, Bulgaria, he saw his young (average age 19) protégés (Rabchanka / Vaitsishkin / Shcharbak / Vauchetski) beat his own sixteen-year-old C-4 1000 m senior world record.

References

External links
 
 

1967 births
Living people
Belarusian male canoeists
Moldovan male canoeists
Soviet male canoeists
Olympic canoeists of Moldova
Olympic canoeists of the Soviet Union
Olympic gold medalists for the Soviet Union
Olympic silver medalists for Moldova
Olympic medalists in canoeing
Canoeists at the 1988 Summer Olympics
Canoeists at the 1996 Summer Olympics
Medalists at the 1988 Summer Olympics
Medalists at the 1996 Summer Olympics
ICF Canoe Sprint World Championships medalists in Canadian
Dynamo sports society athletes
Honoured Masters of Sport of the USSR
Recipients of the Order of Friendship of Peoples
Recipients of the Order of Work Glory
People from Babruysk
Sportspeople from Mogilev Region